Pontchâteau is a commune in the Loire-Atlantique department in western France.

Population

Personalities
Jacques Demy (19311990), film director.
Lydie Denier (1964), actress.

See also
Communes of the Loire-Atlantique department

References

Communes of Loire-Atlantique